Claude Russell (1732-1820) was a high ranking British administrator in the Bengal civil service in India.

Claude was the son of John Russell of Braidshaw, Writer to the Signet, & his third wife, Mary Anderson, and younger brother of Patrick Russell (1727-1805), the herpetologist.
He married Leonora daughter of George Pigot, 1st Baron Pigot, British President of the British East India Company.

He was the first Collector of Aligarh District. He was appointed on 1 August 1804. Prior to this, he was Governor General's Agent at Farukhabad and was directed to distribute the conquered territory into British divisions.

See also
 Aligarh
 Battle of Ally Ghur

References

Administrators in British India
British East India Company people
Aligarh
People from Aligarh
1732 births
1820 deaths